Morozov (masculine) or Morozova (feminine) is a common Russian surname. The alternative spellings are Morosov, Morosoff, Morosow, Morozow, Morozoff, Marozau and Marozaŭ. The surname is derived from the Russian word moroz (frost). The following people share this surname:

Alexander Morozov (disambiguation), disambiguation
Aleksei Morozov (born 1977), Russian ice hockey player
Anatoly Morozov (disambiguation), disambiguation
Anna Morozova (1921–1944), partisan and Hero of the Soviet Union 
Artem Morozov (born 1980), Ukrainian rower
Boris Morozov (1590–1661), Russian statesman and boyar
Evgeny Morozov (born 1984), Belarusian-American researcher and writer
Feodosia Morozova (1632–1675), proponent of the Old Believers
Georgy Morozov (1923–1971), Soviet soldier
Georgy Fedorovich Morozov (1867–1920), Russian forest ecologist  
Igor Morozov (disambiguation), several people
Ivan Morozov (disambiguation), several people
Liza Morozova (born 1973), Russian artist, psychologist and columnist
Mikhail Morozov (disambiguation), several people
Nikolay Morozov (disambiguation), several people
Oleg Morozov (disambiguation), several people
Olga Morozova (born 1949), Russian tennis player
Pavel Marozau (born 1978), Belarusian civil activist and politician
Pavlik Morozov (1918–1932), young martyr of Soviet propaganda
Rinat Morozov (born 1969), Ukrainian football manager
Savva Morozov (1862–1905), Russian entrepreneur and philanthropist
Sergey Morozov (disambiguation), several people
Valentin Morozov (born 1975), Russian ice hockey player
Varvara Alekseevna Morozova (1848-1917), Russian industrialist and philanthropist
Vadim Morozov (1954–2021), Russian politician and businessman
Viktor Morozov, (born 1950), Ukrainian singer-songwriter and translator
Vladimir Morozov (disambiguation), several people
Yury Morozov (disambiguation), several people

See also
Moroz (disambiguation)
Morozov (disambiguation)
Morozovs

Russian-language surnames